Renate Kasché (also credited as Renate Cash) is a German actress known for such films as A Black Veil for Lisa, Josefine Mutzenbacher, Lady Frankenstein and Devil in the Flesh.

Filmography

References

External links

German actresses
German film actresses
Possibly living people
1940 births